Sludge is a semi-solid slurry produced from industrial processes.

Sludge may also refer to:
Sewage sludge
Mining sludge
Biliary sludge
Oil sludge, a solid or gel in motor oil caused by the oil gelling or solidifying
Sludge metal, a fusion genre between doom metal and hardcore punk
Sludge (comics), an Ultraverse comic book
Sludge (film), a 2005 documentary film by Appalshop filmmaker Robert Salyer
SLUDGE syndrome, a medical acronym describing the symptoms of overdose or poisoning of certain drugs and pesticides

See also
Slurry